"Looks Like Sex" is a song by American recording artist Mike Posner from his third mixtape The Layover, although the version of the song on the tape is merely a snippet. It was released on December 2, 2011 in the US. The song was written by Mike Posner and Mason Levy, but is heavily derivative of "Midnight City" by French act M83. The song did not enter the Billboard Hot 100 but peaked on the Bubbling Under Hot 100 Singles chart at number 18. A remix version by Internet cartoon band Your Favorite Martian has released on their YouTube channel. Musically, the song contains "slinky electro-pop" characteristics. It was originally intended to be on his second album, then under the name of Sky High, but once Posner stated that his album would be called Pages, he then confirmed that he started over with recording and that the single would not appear on the album.

Critical reception
Scott Shelter of PopCrush gave the song 4/5 stars stating, "Every Mike Posner song seems to have an unquantifiable layer of cool, thanks to his chilled-out, almost effortless vocal delivery, and ‘Looks Like Sex’ is no exception. The catchy melody makes the track a good choice as the lead single from ‘Sky High.’"  Katherine St Asaph of Popdust said the song "sounds great" and explained "as an instrumental, the single’s admirable" but criticized the lyrics, "the chorus consists entirely of “she looks like sex, sex, sex, sex.” This strikes us as a little underwritten, not to mention more than a little shameless."

Music video
Posner uploaded a lyric music video on Vevo on December 6, 2011. The official music video premiered on January 9, 2012.

Track listing
 Digital download
 "Looks Like Sex" - 3:24

Chart performance

Release history

References

2011 singles
Mike Posner songs
Songs written by Mike Posner